Nicodeme Boucher (born 20 November 1966) is a Senegalese football coach and former player. With his height, which enumerated 1.97 meters high at the time, he was known for being the tallest player in the S.League in his time; he was also known for his goalscoring talent.

Career

Reunion
Aged 20, the Senegalese striker signed for FC Bourges, a team that oscillated between the French second and third divisions at the time. Then, Boucher moved to Vierzon FC, a club within the French fourth tier. Following a one-year spell at Kaizer Chiefs, Boucher was contacted by an agent who offered him a club in Reunion, US Possession where he scored 18 goals on average each season.

S.League
After spending four seasons with US Possession, he trialed with Tiong Bahru F.C. at the end of 1996. Dutch coach Robert Alberts decided to sign the then 28-year old, who responded with 5 goals in 4 games and double figures by the end of the season. Soon, however, the forward returned to Reunion Island for "personal reasons" in 1998. Eventually, Tohari Paijan, the new Tanjong Pagar United coach, went to Reunion Island which induced Boucher to return mid-season. Throughout the remainder of the season, he scored 11 goals which catapulted the Jaguars to a Singapore Cup and Singapore FA Cup double. In 1999, Boucher rejoined US Possession but returned to Tanjong Pagar and formed a so-called 'Twin Tower' attacking partnership with countryman Boubacar Seck, scoring 11 goals in 13 appearances. However, his time at Tanjong Pagar would be hampered by a fight with Warriors FC player Tan Kim Leng which led to one-year ban from playing in Singapore. Instead, the attacker was snapped up by SS Saint-Louisienne, winning the 2001 and 2002 Reunion Premier League titles as well as participating in the 2002 and 2003 CAF Champions League campaigns with the club. At the age of 37, Boucher made one final return to Tanjong Pagar, netting one goal. On account of knee injury, he was released after a few months and spent some time recovering, followed by a four-season spell with AC Excelsior.

Personal life
His brother, Jules, is also a former footballer.

Coaching licenses
UEFA 'A' License

Honors
Singapore Cup: 1998
Singapore FA Cup: 1998

References

External links
 Clicanoo.re tag

Living people
1966 births
Senegalese footballers
Association football forwards
Singapore Premier League players
Bourges 18 players
Vierzon FC players
Kaizer Chiefs F.C. players
SS Saint-Louisienne players
Tanjong Pagar United FC players
Senegalese football managers
Senegalese expatriate footballers
Senegalese expatriate football managers
Senegalese expatriate sportspeople in France
Expatriate footballers in France
Expatriate football managers in France
Senegalese expatriate sportspeople in South Africa
Expatriate soccer players in South Africa
Senegalese expatriate sportspeople in Réunion
Expatriate footballers in Réunion
Senegalese expatriate sportspeople in Singapore
Expatriate footballers in Singapore